Desideratus or Desiderius of Verdun (also Didier;  480 – 8 May 554) was Bishop of Verdun in France from 529 to 554. He is venerated as a Catholic saint, with his feast day on 23 August.

Life
Desideratus was a member of the aristocratic Gallo-Roman family of Syagrii, the son of Gundobaud of Burgundy, and the father of Saint Syagrius of Autun. The name of Desideratus' wife is unknown; she is said to have been "a noble woman from Toulouse," possibly a daughter of Vandal King Gesalec. According to some sources they had four children: Gondoald, Count of Meaux, Syagrius, Bishop of Autun, Didier, Duke of Toulouse, and Salvius, Bishop of Albi.

Gregory of Tours relates that the Merovingian King, Theuderic I, "had done much harm to Desideratus," and had him tortured, removed from office, and forced to flee. When he returned he found that the people had been impoverished. Desideratus solicited a loan from Theuderic's son and successor Theudebert I, promising repayment when business had been restored. Theudebert loaned Desideratus seven thousand gold pieces. When Desideratus went to repay the money, Theudebert refused saying "It is enough for me that, when you asked that I should make a loan, those who were poor and in dire distress were returned to prosperity."

Death
Desideratus "was killed by Sirivald, for reasons of rivalry and revenge. Subsequently, Desideratus's son Syagrius organized a punitive expedition in 554 to assassinate Sirivald in a villa. After murdering a first person by mistake, they returned and fulfilled their mission.

References

6th-century Frankish bishops
Bishops of Verdun
Year of birth unknown
554 deaths
Year of birth uncertain